Themistokles "Themis" Cholevas (12 April 1926 – 30 December 2007) was an international Greek professional basketball player and professional basketball coach.

Professional career
Cholevas was the team captain of the Panellinios Basketball Club and its famous 1950s era "Chrysi Pentada", or "The Golden Five" in English. With Panellinios, he won 3 Greek League championships, in the years 1953, 1955, and 1957. He also won two European Club Championships with the club, as he won the 1955 Brussels Basketball Tournament and the 1956 San Remo Basketball Tournament. While he was also a runner-up at the 1954 San Remo Tournament.

National team career
Cholevas also a member of the senior men's Greek national basketball team. With Greece, he competed at the 1951 Mediterranean Games, the 1951 EuroBasket, the 1952 Summer Olympic Games, and the 1955 Mediterranean Games, where he won a bronze medal.

Coaching career
Cholevas also worked as a basketball coach. He coached AEK Athens, and with them, he won the Greek League's 1965–66 season championship. He also won the bronze medal at the 1971 Mediterranean Games, while coaching the Greek national basketball team. He was also Greece's head coach at the 1982 Balkan Championship.

Track and field
Cholevis was also a track and field athlete that competed in the 800 meters.

References

External links
Segas.gr Profile 
Hellenic Basketball Federation Profile 

1926 births
2007 deaths
AEK B.C. coaches
Basketball players at the 1952 Summer Olympics
Greek basketball coaches
Greek Basket League players
Greek men's basketball players
Olympic basketball players of Greece
Panellinios B.C. players
Point guards
Shooting guards
Basketball players at the 1955 Mediterranean Games
Mediterranean Games bronze medalists for Greece
Mediterranean Games medalists in basketball
Basketball players from Athens